Rich Paul (born December 16, 1981) is an American sports agent based in Cleveland, Ohio. He founded Klutch Sports Group. which represents a number of prominent NBA players. Paul was named by Forbes as one of the world's most powerful sports agents.

Early life
Paul grew up in a one-bedroom apartment above his father's store, R & J Confectionery, on East 125th and Arlington in Glenville, a neighborhood on the east side of Cleveland. His father enrolled him in the private, fee-paying Benedictine, a Roman Catholic high school. His father died of cancer in 1999.

After graduating from high school, Paul was mentored by Distant Replays owner Andy Hyman on selling vintage jerseys. He would buy throwback jerseys from Atlanta and sell them out of his trunk in Cleveland. In 2002, he met LeBron James at the Akron–Canton Airport, where James was impressed by Paul's authentic Warren Moon throwback jersey. The two exchanged contact information, and soon Paul had sold James a Magic Johnson Lakers jersey and a Joe Namath Rams jersey.

Career

In 2003, after the NBA draft, Paul joined James as a part of his small inner circle, along with James' childhood friends Maverick Carter and Randy Mims. He would later start working under Leon Rose, who had negotiated James' extension with the Cavaliers in 2006, at Creative Artists Agency. In 2012, Paul, along with James, left Rose and CAA to start his own agency, Klutch Sports Group. In 2013, Paul enlisted noted long-time agent and attorney Mark Termini to run the NBA contract negotiations for Klutch. By the conclusion of Termini's tenure at Klutch in 2020, Klutch Sports had a roster of 25 clients, and Termini had led negotiations on over $1 billion worth of NBA contracts for said clients. Later that year, United Talent Agency (UTA) made a strategic investment in Klutch Sports Group and asked Paul to run its sports division where he expanded the division's clients from 4 to 23. In 2020, he accepted a position on UTA's board of directors.

Before the start of the 2017–18 season, Phoenix Suns owner Robert Sarver had told Paul that if he did not sever ties to head coach Earl Watson, who had Paul and the Klutch Sports Group as an agent at the time, he would fire Watson from the team. After the Suns got off to a 0–3 start, with two blowout losses (including the worst loss in franchise history and worst season opening performance in NBA history) being the perfect cover story in mind, Watson was fired on October 22, and replaced on an interim basis by associate head coach Jay Triano for the rest of that season. This story later became a part of a major report on Sarver on September 13, 2022, which led to his year-long suspension from the NBA and later resulted in Sarver agreeing to sell the Suns and Phoenix Mercury to a new owner eight days afterward.  Sarver eventually sold his stake with the team and some extra minority stakes to a new ownership group led by Mat Ishbia and his older brother Justin Ishbia on December 20, 2022, which was made official on February 8, 2023.

In August 2019, the National Collegiate Athletic Association (NCAA) changed its regulations for agents, requiring them to hold a bachelor's degree. Called the "Rich Paul Rule" by the media, it was widely seen as a swipe at Paul for having not graduated from college and for working with a high school prospect Darius Bazley who decided to work as an intern for New Balance for a year before entering the 2019 NBA draft rather than attend Syracuse or even enter the NBA G League like he first planned to do. Paul argued in an op-ed in The Athletic that the rule would prevent people from less prestigious backgrounds, people of color, and those without the funds to attend college from working as agents in the future so NCAA executives could have more control. The NCAA later backed down from the regulation change.

In 2020, Paul launched "Klutch Conversations" during the NBA All-Star Weekend with SocialWorks and General Mills to encourage financial literacy among young people.

In August 2021, Rich Paul was reportedly being sued by Nerlens Noel on the grounds of a breach of fiduciary duty, breach of contract, and negligence for his role in turning down a $70 million contract offer from the Dallas Mavericks in the offseason preceding the 2017–18 season. The two eventually reached a settlement on January 11, 2023, with Noel paying full commissions on a $5 million deal he signed in 2020 with the New York Knicks and Noel withdrawing all legal precedings afterward.

Recognition 
Paul was included in the 2020 "Ebony Power 100 List". In 2020, Paul was listed at number nine in Forbes list of the "World's Most Powerful Sports Agents".

Personal life 
As of 2021, he is in a relationship with the English singer-songwriter Adele. The two got engaged in February 2023

References

1981 births
Living people
American sports agents
Businesspeople from Cleveland
Businesspeople from Akron, Ohio